AAbagasthanna  is a village in Sri Lanka. It is located within Kandy District, Central Province.

History
Archibald Campbell Lawrie writes in his 1896 gazetteer of the province that the inhabitants of Alanduwaka are of the "Chalia" caste.

Demographics

See also
List of towns in Central Province, Sri Lanka

References

External links

Populated places in Kandy District